Meridian School is a high school, founded in 1995 in Hyderabad, India. The school follows the Central Board of Secondary Education (CBSE) syllabus. Meridian School has a branch in Madhapur (established in 2006), as well as in Kukatpally (established in 2008). The main is located in Banjara Hills.

Admissions and curriculum
Admission to pre-primary school entails an interview with the student and parents. From Class I, there is an entrance exam. Student intake is limited to 30 per class. Languages offered include Hindi, Telugu, Urdu, and French which fifth graders onwards have an option of taking. Meridian is one of the top most school in Hyderabad. Meridian follows British council, from 6th grade onwards students are in secondary division.

Leadership
The Correspondents of the School are Mr. B.S. Neelakanta and Mrs. Renuka B. The Principal of Meridian School for Boys and Girls, Hyderabad is Lalitha Naidu.

Recognition
In 2007, the principal of the school, Usha Reddy, was the cover story in the October issue of the magazine, Mentor. Meridian school, Madhapur has also won the British council award for two consecutive years . Also it had 100% results for grade 10 .

References

External links
 Official website
 Official Parent Association

Schools in Hyderabad, India
Educational institutions established in 1995
1985 establishments in Andhra Pradesh